Sangham may refer to:
 Sangham (1954 film), an Indian Telugu-language film
 Sangham (1988 film), an Indian Malayalam-language film